Modern American School may refer to:
Modern American School (Jordan)
Modern American School (Mexico)